The Rusty film series comprises eight American films produced for young audiences between 1945 and 1949 by Columbia Pictures. Child actor Ted Donaldson starred as Danny Mitchell in the series, which relates the adventures of a German Shepherd dog named Rusty. The role of Rusty was played by Ace the Wonder Dog in the first feature, Adventures of Rusty (1945). A police dog named Rip took over the role for the second film, The Return of Rusty (1946). In the later films Rusty was played by Flame, a charismatic dog star who was featured in three separate series.

Though the Rusty films were B-movies primarily shown as the second half of a double-bill, the films usually had a humanist subtext and subtly promoted positive values on social issues of the era. Among the directors of the series was John Sturges. Among the regular cast members was child actor David Ackles, who appeared in six of the eight films.

Films

References

Film series introduced in 1945
American film series
Columbia Pictures franchises
American children's films
Films about dogs